"Never Let You Go" is a song recorded by Greek singer Mando, written by herself and Teri Siganos, and produced by Johnny Jam. It is best known as the  entry at the Eurovision Song Contest 2003, held in Riga.

Background
The song is a dramatic ballad, with the singer telling her lover all the things she would do for him, but emphasising that she would "never let [him] go". The song topped the Greek charts and was certified gold in Greece.

Eurovision
The song was performed seventeenth on the night, following 's Olexandr Ponomariov with "Hasta La Vista" and preceding 's Jostein Hasselgård with "I'm Not Afraid To Move On". It was the first time in the contest that the Greek entry did not feature any Greek lyrics as the song was performed fully in English. At the close of voting, it had received 25 points and was placed 17th in a field of 26.

For her Eurovision appearance, Mando wore an unusual navy blue gown, with a very tight lace-up bodice.

It was succeeded as Greek entry at the 2004 contest by Sakis Rouvas with "Shake It".

Track listing
"Never Let You Go" (Euro Version) - 3:02
"Never Let You Go" (Original Version)- 4:19
"Never Let You Go" (English/Greek Version)- 4:20
"Never Let You Go" (Dance Mix) - 4:22
"Never Let You Go" (Extended Club Mix) - 5:54

Charts

References

Eurovision songs of Greece
Eurovision songs of 2003
Mando (singer) songs
Music videos directed by Kostas Kapetanidis
Songs written by Mando (singer)
Number-one singles in Greece
English-language Greek songs
2003 songs